The 1993 Wills Badminton World Cup was the fifteenth edition of an international tournament Badminton World Cup. The event was held in New Delhi, India in from 1 September to 5 September 1993. Indonesia won both the singles event with men's doubles while Sweden won women's doubles and cross country pair from England & Sweden combined won the mixed doubles.

Medalists

Men's singles

Finals

Women's singles

Finals

Men's doubles

Finals

Women's doubles

Finals

Mixed doubles

Finals

Sources 
 
 
 
https://www.myheritage.com/research/record-10450-9511904/canberra-times-act-sep-6-1993?snippet=25774e56323f3398e7e63c53ad90b16d#fullscreen

References 

Badminton World Cup
1993 in badminton
1993 in Indian sport
Sport in New Delhi
International sports competitions hosted by India